Robert William Paynter BSC (12 March 1928 – 20 October 2010) was an English cinematographer. 

After leaving the Mercers' School in the City of London at the age of 15, Paynter entered the film industry as a camera trainee with the Government Film Department. 

He is known for his collaborations with John Landis and Michael Winner.

Collaborations

John Landis
Paynter worked with director John Landis on five films: An American Werewolf in London, Trading Places, Thriller, Into the Night and Spies Like Us. Paynter helped to create a "pop" comic book-style for American Werewolf, Thriller and Into the Night. He also made a cameo in three Landis' productions: Into the Night (as Security Guard), Spies like Us (as Dr. Gill) and Burke and Hare.

Michael Winner
Winner collaborated on 10 films with Paynter (from 1969 to 1984), including: The Big Sleep (1978) and Scream for Help (1984).

Filmography

Films
 Rock-a-Doodle (1992, live-action sequences)
 Strike It Rich (1990)
 When the Whales Came (1989)
 Little Shop of Horrors (1986)
 Spies Like Us (1985)
 Into the Night (1985)
 The Muppets Take Manhattan (1984)
 Scream for Help (1984)
 Trading Places (1983)
 Superman III (1983)
 An American Werewolf in London (1981)
 Superman II (1980)
 The Big Sleep (1978)
 Firepower (1979)
 High Velocity (1976)
 Scorpio (1973)
 The Mechanic (1972)
 Chato's Land (1972)
 The Nightcomers (1971)
 Lawman (1971)
 The Games (1970)
 Hannibal Brooks (1969)

Television
 The Zoo Gang (1974)

Music videos
 Michael Jackson's Thriller (1983)

References

External links

1928 births
English cinematographers
2010 deaths
Film people from London
People educated at Mercers' School